Andrea De Paoli (born 6 August 1999), is an Italian professional footballer who plays as a striker for  club Siena on loan from Ascoli.

He had great technical abilities with both feet, good ball defense and excellent position abilities all over the field. He has a great shot, especially in free kicks. He can play as central striker alone or not, sometimes he plays as wing or 10.

Early career
He was born in Genoa and, after starting in the school team, he was noticed by the Genoa observers who immediately signed him. In Genoa, the Italian Serie A team was the owner of all the youth teams until the Primavera (18 years old). In the meantime he studied until he reached the diploma of the Linguistic Lyceum.

Club career
After a short loan to Ternana, his first experience in professional football was in San Benedetto del Tronto (Serie C) in 2018 with the Sambenedettese team in which he immediately scored a goal on his debut but a muscle injury made that year difficult.

In 2019 he played a starter with the Rieti team, playing all the games of the Championship until the stop required by the Covid pandemic (March 2020).

On 1 July 2020 he signed a 3-year contract with Cavese.

On 1 February 2021 he joined Monopoli on a 1.5-year contract.

On 24 August 2021, he moved to Serie B club Ascoli on loan with an obligation to buy.

References

External links

1999 births
Footballers from Genoa
Living people
Italian footballers
Association football midfielders
Brescia Calcio players
Genoa C.F.C. players
Ternana Calcio players
A.S. Sambenedettese players
F.C. Rieti players
Cavese 1919 players
S.S. Monopoli 1966 players
Ascoli Calcio 1898 F.C. players
A.C.N. Siena 1904 players
Serie B players
Serie C players